The first presidency of Carlos Andrés Pérez (from 1974 to 1979) coincided with the oil boom of 1974, which saw Venezuela's economy prosper. Carlos Andrés Pérez launched a program of rapid modernization. His first presidency also saw the nationalization of the oil industry. He regained the presidency in 1988 (Second Presidency of Carlos Andrés Pérez).

Background

In 1973, Carlos Andrés Pérez was nominated to run for the presidency for AD. Youthful and energetic, Perez ran a vibrant and triumphalist campaign, one of the first to use the services of American advertising gurus and political consultants in the country's history. During the run up to elections, he visited nearly all the villages and cities of Venezuela by foot and walked more than 5800 kilometers. He was elected in December of that year, receiving 48.7% of the vote against the 36.7% of his main rival. Turnout in these elections reached an unprecedented 97% of all eligible voters, a level which has not been achieved since.

Many people were skeptical that Venezuelans would choose such a controversial figure as Pérez, but when the results were in they showed he had won a clear a victory, but, what was even more important, AD had an absolute majority in Congress: the pardo masses were still adecos to the core (1973). Pérez's appeal was not only to the poor but also to the elite and the middle class, for, it was widely reported in political circles and the media, that his political advisor Diego Arria created his public persona as a well-tailored man and in general refurbished his "image".

Presidency

Domestic policy
One of the most radical aspects of Pérez's program for government was the notion that petroleum oil was a tool for under-developed nations like Venezuela to attain first world status and usher a fairer, more equitable international order. International events, including the Yom Kippur War of 1973, contributed to the implementation of this vision. Drastic increases in petroleum prices led to an economic bonanza for the country just as Pérez started his term. His policies, including the nationalization of the iron and petroleum industries, investment in large state-owned industrial projects for the production of aluminium and hydroelectric energy, infrastructure improvements, and the funding of social welfare and scholarship programs, were extremely ambitious and involved massive government spending, to the tune of almost $53 billion. His measures to protect the environment and foster sustainable development earned him the Earth Care award in 1975, the first time a Latin American leader had received this recognition.

Congress gave Pérez a mandate to rule by decree for 100 days - and then for a further 100 days. He also had a fiscal fortune in his hands such as no Venezuelan president ever had. And Pérez didn’t lose time to start spending it. He commissioned a report on government, which was prepared and carried out by Arnoldo Gabaldón. It contained a blueprint for further large scale bureaucratic expansion. Gabaldón himself was named to a super-ministry, which combined public works and communications. Since it was impossible to hire every Venezuelan, Pérez decreed that all public places should have bathroom attendants and that every elevator the country over should have an operator, although Venezuela had only had one or two hand-operated elevators before the Pérez Jiménez building euphoria. Contracts were handed out with abandon, and Venezuelans applauded with gusto. Pérez proclaimed that the oil wealth would not be squandered and founded a huge fund for "productive investments". This fund was exhausted very quickly. Congress had surrendered its power of fiscal oversight, one of the historical bases of democracy. Corruption went up incalculably, and there was even a case in which Venezuela bought a meat-freezing ship named the Sierra Nevada, which was anchored to store part of the immense quantity of imports that were being handled. The commissioner's fee here was well known as well as its recipient, who was never even tried. Ferries were bought in Scandinavia for routes between Venezuelan and the offshore Dutch free ports. Their windows could not be opened, and they were not equipped for the Venezuelan heat. On any given day, one could see dozens of ships queuing to unload in all Venezuelan ports, which meant that demurrage charges were huge and were obviously passed on to consumers. But consumerism was the whole point of it all. The bolivar, Venezuela's currency, was so over-valued that almost anybody in Venezuela with a minimum of initiative could go to Miami and bring a suitcase-load of goods which were sold to customers, usually friends or neighbors. Even servant quarters were in the net of this informal import economy. In Miami, Venezuelans became known as "gimme two" (of anything, at any price).

Only in the television market did Pérez show scruples against rampant consumerism: Possibly under pressure from retailers with large inventories of black-and-white sets, he refused to allow color TV sets until far into his administration, although one could buy them on the free-port island of Margarita and could see color TV in Caracas, where transmissions of color broadcasts had already started. Pérez also delayed the construction of the Caracas metropolitan underground, presumably because it had been initiated by Caldera. Crime in the streets was another by-product of the Venezuelan oil economy, although this could only partially be blamed on the new riches — obviously, with so much spending going on, thugs had easy marks anywhere — but mainly on the thousands of guns that had been put into circulation during the leftist insurgency that Pérez battled. But the government did nothing effective to address the problem, which still plagues Venezuela. Pérez simply ignored it.

The vulgarity and rot that was eating into Venezuelan society is difficult to describe in terms that would seem comprehensible, although foreign academics went on talking about Venezuelan society as if it were normal and not in the grasp of a collective frenzy. Yet Pérez's credentials as a nationalist leader were not soiled. In fact, for many they were enhanced because in 1975 he nationalized the iron industry, and in 1976 he jumped further and nationalized the oil industry. Since by that time Venezuela was equipped to manage it, not much harm was done by that in itself, but with all the new collaterals that the government could offer, Pérez, after having gone through the "surplus" for investments, started taking out international loans and not small ones but sizable ones. Pérez "statized" the Venezuelan economy to such a degree that the load of paperwork to open a business was so heavy that a service branch was created called "permisologia" (approximately, the "science" of permits), to which businessmen had to recur as a matter of course if they wanted to get the necessary bureaucratic approval. Permisologia was not meant to deter foreigners, and it was more burdensome on Venezuelan small entrepreneurs than on any other economic sector. Leftists were in a dazzled quandary because, on one hand, they disliked Pérez, but, on the other, they couldn’t complain about the state's interference because that was part of their own social and economic agenda. Labor unions, which in Venezuela were corrupt and pervasive and AD-managed, stood solidly behind Pérez.

One thing that can be credited to Pérez is that he introduced legislation to protect the environment, whereas Caldera had tried to build a road into the vast southern area of Venezuela known as Amazonas, which his government wanted to settle and exploit. Since soils there are barren, all that could have been achieved would have been the destruction of forested areas where only Amerindian tribes and missionaries, both Catholic and Baptist, lived. By the time that Pérez was through with Venezuela, it was palpable that its society was more unequal than it ever had been: The pardos had been done in again, and as to economic diversification, there was essentially none. Even import-substitution in the automobile industry went down the drain when Pérez started importing Dodge Darts and selling them at subsidized prices.

Foreign policy

In the international arena, Perez supported democratic and progressive causes in Latin America and the world. He opposed the Somoza and Pinochet dictatorships and played a crucial role in the finalizing of the agreement for the transfer of the Panama Canal from American to Panamanian control. In 1975, with Mexican President Luis Echeverría, he found SELA, the Latin American Economic System, created to foster economic cooperation and scientific exchange between the nations of Latin America. He also supported the democratization process in Spain, as he brought Felipe González, who was living in exile, back to Spain in a private flight and thus strengthened the Spanish Socialist Workers' Party.

Legacy
Towards the end of his first term in office, Pérez's reputation was tarnished by accusations of excessive, and disorderly, government spending. His administration was often referred to as Saudi Venezuela for its grandiose and extravagant ambitions. In addition, there were allegations of corruption and trafficking of influence, often involving members of Pérez's intimate circle, such as his mistress Cecilia Matos, or financiers and businessmen who donated to his campaign. A well-publicized rift with his former mentor Rómulo Betancourt and disgruntled members of AD all pointed to the fading of Pérez's political standing. By the 1978 elections, there was a sense among many citizens that the influx of petrodollars after 1973 had not been properly managed. The country was importing 80% of all foodstuffs consumed. Agricultural production was stagnant. The national debt had skyrocketed. And whilst per capita income had increased and prosperity was evident in Caracas and other major cities, the country was also more expensive and a significant minority of Venezuelans were still mired in poverty. This malaise led to the defeat of AD at the polls by the opposition Social Christian Party. The newly elected president, Luis Herrera Campins, famously stated in his inaugural speech that he was "inheriting a mortgaged country."

Nonetheless, the memory of CAP's first term proved powerful enough and positive enough in his 1988 electoral campaign to earn him a second term, resulting in the Second Presidency of Carlos Andrés Pérez.

Cabinet

See also 
Carlos Andrés Pérez
Second Presidency of Carlos Andrés Pérez
Presidents of Venezuela

References

History of Venezuela
Carlos Andrés Pérez
Pérez, Carlos Andrés